Mornington is a former parliamentary electorate from 1946 to 1963, centred on the suburb of Mornington in the city of Dunedin, New Zealand.

Population centres
The 1941 New Zealand census had been postponed due to World War II, so the 1946 electoral redistribution had to take ten years of population growth and movements into account. The North Island gained a further two electorates from the South Island due to faster population growth. The abolition of the country quota through the Electoral Amendment Act, 1945 reduced the number and increased the size of rural electorates. None of the existing electorates remained unchanged, 27 electorates were abolished, eight former electorates were re-established, and 19 electorates were created for the first time, including Mornington. In the east, it was bounded by the railway. In the north, it extended as far as Brockville. In the southwest, it extended to Green Island.

In the 1952 electoral redistribution, boundary adjustments were minor. In the 1957 electoral redistribution, the Mornington electorate shifted west into areas that previously belonged to the  electorate. Settlements that were gained in this process include Wingatui, Fairfield, East Taieri, and the town of Mosgiel.

The Mornington electorate was abolished through the 1962 electoral redistribution. Most of its area went to the Otago Central electorate, some went to the  electorate, and its easternmost part went to the  electorate.

History
During this period, the Mornington electorate was represented by one Member of Parliament, Wally Hudson of the Labour Party. When the electorate was abolished in 1963, Hudson retired from Parliament.

Members of Parliament
Key

Election results

1960 election

1957 election

1954 election

1951 election

1949 election

1946 election

Notes

References

Historical electorates of New Zealand
Politics of Dunedin
1946 establishments in New Zealand
1963 disestablishments in New Zealand